Cutie Honey: Tears is a 2016 Japanese film directed by Asai Takeshi. The film is based on the manga series Cutie Honey written and illustrated by Go Nagai and stars Mariya Nishiuchi as the title character. It was released in Japan by Toei Company on October 1, 2016.

Plot
In the near future, abnormal weather conditions and the spread of a virus has caused man's population to decrease. Artificial intelligence originally built to help and preserve what was left of humanity by controlling the world's work and economy. In this bleak future, the rich and powerful dominate the world and live above the poor. The poor are suffering on the polluted streets with toxic rain pouring down upon them that is caused by the frivolous activities of the wealthy.

One man from the upper area, Dr. Kisaragi, plans to change the world for the better by creating an android with A.I. and emotions indistinguishable from a human using the brain memory patterns of his deceased daughter. The android Hitomi Kisaragi is brought down to lower areas at the cost of Dr. Kisaragi's life. On the surface, Honey pairs up with journalist Seiji Hayami and the resistance leader Kazuhito Uraki to fight against the oppressors of this world, controlled by the evil android known as Jill.

Cast
Mariya Nishiuchi as Hitomi Kisaragi/Codename: Cutie Honey
Takahiro Miura as Seiji Hayami
Nicole Ishida as Jill
Sousuke Takaoka as Kazuhito Uraki
Tasuku Nagase as Ryuta Kimura 
Ren Imai as Yukiko Kiyose
Eric Jacobsen as Chris
Kouichi Iwaki as Dr. Kisaragi
Go Nagai (cameo only)

Production
Principal photography ended in December 2015.

Release
The film was released in Japan by Toei Company on October 1, 2016.

References

External links
 

Cutie Honey
2010s Japanese films
Aeon Entertainment films
Android (robot) films
Japanese magical girl films
Live-action films based on manga
Toei Company films
Tokusatsu films